Merapani is a town and a subdivision of Golaghat district  in the state of Assam and Nagaland. Half of Merapani lies in the Wokha district of Nagaland and Half lies in Golaghat District of Assam. There is a Border Magistrate Office in Merapani, Wokha. The Nagaland Seed Farm is also in Merapani. The dominant tribe of Merapani are the Lotha Naga. Since 2000s many Bangladeshi illegal immigrants has settled in Merapani thereby changing the whole social structure of the town. Politically, Merapani falls under 40th Bhandari Assembly Constituency of Nagaland. In almost all General Elections, Merapani has been the bellwether town of 40th Bhandari Assembly constituency and has voted for the winning candidate every time.  Mmhonlumo Kikon of BJP is present MLA.

Geography

Notable people
Nanda Kirati Dewan, Indian Gorkha leader

References

Cities and towns in Golaghat district